The Cuban Revolution normally refers to the 1953–1959 revolution led by Fidel Castro.

Other conflicts known as the Cuban Revolution are:
Ten Years' War, Cuban independence conflict of 1868–1878
Little War (Cuba), conflict of 1879–1880 
Cuban War of Independence, conflict with Spain of 1895–1898
Sergeants' Revolt, 1933 coup led by Fulgencio Batista

See also
Cuban protests (disambiguation)